Changbai Korean Autonomous County, or simply Changbai County (Chosŏn'gŭl: 장백현; Hangul: 창바현) is a county in southern Jilin province, China, facing Hyesan, North Korea. The county has a total population of 85,000 people, 14,000 of which are ethnic Koreans (16.9% of the county's population).

Apart from the Yanbian Korean Autonomous Prefecture, Changbai is the only Korean autonomous area of the People's Republic of China.

Administrative divisions
There are seven towns and one township.

Towns:
 ( / )
Shisidaogou ( / )
Badaogou ( / )
Malugou ( / )
Shi'erdaogou ( / )
Xinfangzi ( / )
Baoquanshan ( / )

The only township in the county is Longgang Township ( / ).

Climate

See also
 Changbai–Hyesan International Bridge
 Yanbian Korean Autonomous Prefecture
 Koreans in China

References

County-level divisions of Jilin
Baishan
China–North Korea border crossings
Koreans in China
Korean diaspora in China
Korean-speaking countries and territories